A list of all international tests and other matches played by the Canada national rugby union team.

2020 to 2029

2010 to 2019

2000 to 2009

1990 to 1999

1980 to 1989

1932 to 1979

See also
 History of rugby union matches between Canada and Chile
 History of rugby union matches between Canada and France
 History of rugby union matches between Canada and Romania
 History of rugby union matches between Canada and United States
 History of rugby union matches between Canada and Wales

References

Canada